is a private university in Adachi, Tokyo, Japan. It was chartered as a university in 1949 with Yasujiro Niwa as first president. Denki (電機) means an electric device in Japanese, and the university is dedicated to science and technology.

Notable alumni
Jirō Nitta, novelist and meteorologist
Eiji Tsuburaya, special effects director of films and television series, including Godzilla and Ultraman
Tomohiro Nishikado, creator of the Space Invaders shooter game
Jun'ya "ZUN" Ōta, sole member of Team Shanghai Alice and creator of the Touhou Project shoot 'em up video game series
Hisashi Koinuma (鯉沼久史), director of the Samurai Warriors video game series and chief operating officer of Koei Tecmo (2015–)

In popular culture
 In the visual novel Steins;Gate, characters Okabe Rintaro and Hashida Itaru attend the university.

References

External links
 Official website 

Educational institutions established in 1949
Private universities and colleges in Japan
Tokyo Denki University
Engineering universities and colleges in Japan
1949 establishments in Japan
Universities and colleges in Tokyo